Kilgariff or Kilgarriff is a surname. Notable people with the surname include:

People
 Adam Kilgarriff (1960–2015), British corpus linguist
 Bernie Kilgariff (1923–2010), Australian politician
 Karen Kilgariff (born 1970), American actress and writer
 Michael Kilgarriff (born 1937), British actor

Places
Kilgarriff, County Cork, a civil parish in County Cork, Ireland
Kilgariff, Northern Territory, a suburb in Australia